Simonds Coach & Travel is a bus operator based in Diss, UK.

History 
The firm started in 1927 as a car repair workshop.

In 2014, the firm had a fleet of 47 vehicles, including 17 buses. In 2015, the firm had just under 100 employees.

During the COVID-19 pandemic, the company received grants from the British Government to allow it to continue operating bus services.

References

External links 

 Official website

Bus operators in Norfolk
1927 establishments in England